Six is the sixth studio (instrumental) album (half including live material) by the jazz rock band Soft Machine, originally released in 1973 as a double LP. This is the first album to feature Karl Jenkins as a member and songwriter for the group. He eventually became the de facto leader and main composer of the group following the departure of the last remaining original member, Mike Ratledge in 1976.

Overview
The previous two albums had been issued with slightly different titles in different countries (Fourth and Fifth in the UK, Four and 5 in the USA, with the former album showing a numeral 4 on the cover, while the album before that had been titled Third worldwide). On this album, they deferred to their American standard for worldwide release.

The album includes a live record and a studio record, individually titled as shown in the track listing below.  One song from the live album, "All White", had been previously recorded for their Fifth album.

Track listing

Soft Machine "Six" Album – Live Record

Side one
"Fanfare" (Karl Jenkins) – 0:42
"All White" (Mike Ratledge) – 4:46
"Between" (Jenkins / Ratledge) – 2:24
"Riff I" (Jenkins) – 4:36
"37½" (Ratledge) – 6:51

Side two
"Gesolreut" (Ratledge) – 6:17
"E.P.V." (Jenkins) – 2:47
"Lefty" (Soft Machine) – 4:56
"Stumble" (Jenkins) – 1:42
"5 from 13 (for Phil Seamen with Love & Thanks)" (John Marshall) – 5:15
"Riff II" (Jenkins) – 1:20

Note: "Lefty" composer credit changed to (Hopper / Jenkins / Marshall) on later CD editions.

Soft Machine "Six" Album – Studio Record

Side one
"The Soft Weed Factor" (Jenkins) – 11:18
"Stanley Stamp's Gibbon Album (for B.O.)" (Ratledge) – 5:58

Side two
"Chloe and the Pirates" (Ratledge) – 9:30
"1983" (Hugh Hopper) – 7:54
Note: On U.S. LP pressings, "1983" is slightly shorter, with a listed running time of 7:11.

Personnel
Soft Machine
Karl Jenkins – oboe, baritone and soprano saxophones, electric piano and grand piano, celeste
Mike Ratledge – organ, electric and grand piano, celeste
Hugh Hopper – bass guitar; sound effects on "1983"
John Marshall – drums, percussion

Record 1: Recorded at the Brighton Dome and at the Guildford Civic Hall and mixed at Advision Studios, London during the months of October and November 1972.

Record 2: "1983" recorded and mixed at Advision Studios, London. All other compositions recorded and mixed at CBS Studios, London during the months of November and December 1972.

References

External links 
 Soft Machine - Six (1973) album review by Jason Anderson, credits & releases at AllMusic
 Soft Machine - Six (1973) album releases & credits at Discogs
 Soft Machine - Six (1973) album to be listened on Spotify

Soft Machine albums
1973 albums
CBS Records albums
Columbia Records albums